José Serrano Simeón (14 October 1873 – 8 March 1941) was a Spanish composer of zarzuelas. He was born in Sueca, Valencia, Spain.

His most famous works include La dolorosa ("Lady of the Sorrows") and La canción del olvido ("The Song of Forgetting"). Serrano’s output mainly consists of popular, one-act zarzuelas, many filled with strong, dramatic and emotional situations. He is considered to be the musical heir of Federico Chueca; and the influence of Giacomo Puccini and Italian verismo is evident in many of his works.

Serrano died in Madrid aged 67.

References

1873 births
1941 deaths
People from Ribera Baixa
Composers from the Valencian Community
Spanish classical composers
Spanish male classical composers
Spanish opera composers
Male opera composers